Abbo of Auxerre was a Benedictine abbot and bishop of Auxerre.

He had been a monk, and later abbot, of the Abbey of Saint-Germain d'Auxerre, and succeeded his brother Heribald of Auxerre as bishop of Auxerre. He resigned from the see in 859. He assisted in the synod of Poncy in 860, and died on 3 December that year. He is not listed in the Roman Martyrology, the official but incomplete list of saints recognized by the Roman Catholic Church. His biography is included in Les Petits Bollandistes.

References

Books
Holweck, F. G., A Biographical Dictionary of the Saints. St. Louis, MO: B. Herder Book Co., 1924.

Year of birth unknown
860 deaths
French abbots
Bishops of Auxerre
9th-century French bishops
9th-century Christian saints
Saints of West Francia